John or Johnny Cunningham may refer to:

Military
John Cunningham (officer) (fl. 1689), Anglo-Irish soldier at the Siege of Derry
John Cunningham, 15th Earl of Glencairn (1749–1796), Scottish nobleman, cavalry officer, and priest
John Cunningham (Royal Navy officer) (1885–1962), RN, First Sea Lord
John Cunningham (VC 1917) (1890–1917), Prince of Wales's Leinster Regiment
John Cunningham (VC 1916) (1897–1941), East Yorkshire Regiment
John Cunningham (RAF officer) (1917–2002), RAF night fighter ace

Politics and law
Sir John Cunningham, 1st Baronet (died 1684), member of the Parliament of Scotland
John Cunningham (Nova Scotia judge) (fl. 1761–1785), Canadian judge and politician
John Cunningham (Nova Scotia politician) (1776–1847), Canadian farmer, official and politician
John Cunninghame, Lord Cunninghame (1782–1854), Scottish judge
John Cunningham (Australian politician) (1867–1949), Australian politician in Western Australia
J. M. A. Cunningham (1912–1996), Australian politician in Western Australia
John E. Cunningham (born 1931), U.S. Representative from Washington
John F. Cunningham (died 1954), Irish surgeon and member of the 7th Seanad of Ireland
John M. Cunningham,  American attorney and member of the Massachusetts Governor's Council

Religion
John William Cunningham (1780–1861), evangelical clergyman of the Church of England
John Cunningham (moderator) (1819–1893), General Assembly of the Church of Scotland in 1886
John Francis Cunningham (bishop) (1842–1919), Irish-born prelate of the Roman Catholic Church
John Cunningham (bishop) (1938–2021), Roman Catholic bishop of Galloway, Scotland

Science and medicine
John Francis Cunningham (surgeon) (1875–1932), British ophthalmic surgeon
John R. Cunningham (1927–2020), Canadian medical physicist
John Cunningham (physician) (born 1949), physician to the Queen of the United Kingdom

Sports
John Cunningham (cricketer) (1854–1932), New Zealand cricketer
John Cunningham (Scottish footballer) (1868–?), Scottish footballer
John Cunningham (baseball) (1892–?), Negro leagues shortstop
John Crabbe Cunningham (1927–1980), Scottish mountaineer
John Cunningham (rugby league) (born 1952), English rugby league footballer of the 1970s, for England, and Barrow
John Cunningham (Australian footballer) (born 1974), Geelong, Norwood and Port Melbourne player
John Cunningham (Gaelic footballer) (fl. 1980s–1990s), played for Donegal
John Cunningham (Northern Ireland footballer), football coach and former football player

Writers
John Cunningham (poet and dramatist) (1729–1773), Irish pastoral poet and dramatist
John W. Cunningham (1915–2002), American author of Western novels and stories
John T. Cunningham (1915–2012), American journalist, writer, and historian
John Cunningham (journalist) (1945–2012), Irish newspaper editor

Others
John Cunningham (sorcerer) (aka "Doctor Fian", died 1591), Scottish schoolmaster executed for sorcery in the North Berwick witch trials
John Cunningham (explorer) (c. 1575–1651), Scottish explorer for Denmark
John Cunningham (architect) (1799–1873), Scottish architect
John Rood Cunningham (1891–1980), American academic, president of Davidson College
Johnny Cunningham (1957–2003), Scottish folk musician
John Cunningham (Irish criminal), Irish kidnapper and illicit drug smuggler

Other uses
Human polyomavirus 2, referred as "John Cunningham virus"

See also
Jack Cunningham (disambiguation)